The Stuguflåt Bridge ( or ) is a stone railway bridge north of Stuguflåten on the Rauma Line over the Rauma River in Innlandet county, Norway.

Work began on the bridge in 1919, and the foundations were laid in autumn 1920, with the walls started by summer 1921. The first rails were laid on 16 September 1921 and were finished on 22 August 1922. The first train crossed in autumn 1922 and materials from this cargo were used to make a permanent snowplough.

In January 1945, Joachim Rønneberg and SOE agents (Operation Fieldfare) tried to damage the bridge in order to halt the movement by German occupying forces on the Rauma Line. The bridge was reopened three weeks later.

See also
List of bridges in Norway
List of bridges in Norway by length

References

External links
 Raumabanen.net/Anleggstiden – Plans and building of Rauma Line.

Railway bridges in Innlandet
Bridges completed in 1922
Lesja
1922 establishments in Norway
Bridges on the Rauma Line